Nicklas Pedersen (born 5 May 1990) is a Danish carpenter, model and male pageant winner who was crowned Mister World 2014 at the Riviera International Conference Centre, Torbay, England.

Pageantry

Mister World 2014
Pedersen was crowned as Mister World 2014 represented Denmark at the Riviera International Conference Centre, Torbay, on 15 June 2014. He was overcame the 45 contestants to win the Mister World. Additionally, he was awarded as The Sport Challenge Winner. He was nominated into the Top 10 of Extreme Sport Challenge and Top 3 Multi-Media Challenge at the pageant.

During his reign, he  travelled to Australia, Brazil, Denmark, France, Malta, Spain, Indonesia, United States and the United Kingdom.

He appeared as emcee at the Variety Telethon in Iowa in March 2015.  A benefit for Variety, the Children's Charity - Iowa, United States

References

External links
 Official Mister World website
 Official Miss & Mister Denmark website

Mister World
1990 births
Danish male models
Living people
Danish beauty pageant winners
Male beauty pageant winners